The Aerosette MH-46 Eclipse is a Czech ultralight aircraft, designed and produced by Aerosette of Chrastava. The aircraft is supplied as a complete ready-to-fly-aircraft.

Design and development
The MH-46 was designed to comply with the Fédération Aéronautique Internationale microlight rules and intended for personal use and flight training. It features a strut-braced high-wing, a two-seats-in-side-by-side configuration enclosed cockpit, fixed tricycle landing gear and a single engine in tractor configuration.

The aircraft is made from composites. Its  span wing is supported by a single strut on each side. Standard engines available are the  Rotax 582 two-stroke and the  Rotax 912ULS four-stroke powerplant.

Specifications (MH-46 Eclipse)

References

External links

2000s Czech ultralight aircraft
Homebuilt aircraft
Single-engined tractor aircraft